Adriaan Hendrik "Ad" Stouthamer (31 October 1931- 20 februari 2023) was a Dutch microbiologist. He was a professor at the Vrije Universiteit Amsterdam from the 1960s to 1996.

Life
Stouthamer was born on 31 October 1931 in Sas van Gent. In 1960 he obtained his doctorate at Utrecht University under Klaas Winkler with a thesis titled: "Koolhydraatstofwisseling van de azijnzuurbacteriën". In 1963 he became lecturer at the Vrije Universiteit Amsterdam. He gave his inaugural lecture as professor in 1968. From 1992 to 1995 he had a special teaching assignment in applied microbiology. He retired in autumn 1996 and was succeeded in his chair by Hans Westerhoff.

Stouthamer was elected a member of the Royal Netherlands Academy of Arts and Sciences in 1974. In 1991 he gave the Kluyver lecture at the Royal Netherlands Association for Microbiology.

References

1931 births
Living people
Dutch microbiologists
Members of the Royal Netherlands Academy of Arts and Sciences
People from Sas van Gent
Utrecht University alumni
Academic staff of Vrije Universiteit Amsterdam